Diplodon dunkerianus is a species of bivalve in the family Hyriidae. It is endemic to Brazil.

References

Fauna of Brazil
Hyriidae
Endemic fauna of Brazil
Bivalves described in 1857
Taxonomy articles created by Polbot
Taxa named by Isaac Lea